Nazir Ahmad Khan is a Pakistani politician who has been a member of the Provincial Assembly of the Punjab since August 2018.

Political career
He was elected to the Provincial Assembly of the Punjab as a candidate of Pakistan Tehreek-e-Insaf from Constituency PP-228 (Lodhran-V) in 2018 Pakistani general election. He de-seated due to vote against party policy for Chief Minister of Punjab election  on 16 April 2022.

References

Living people
Pakistan Tehreek-e-Insaf MPAs (Punjab)
Year of birth missing (living people)
Members of the Constituent Assembly of Pakistan